Rudie Hermann Kuiter (born 1943) is an Australian underwater photographer, taxonomist, marine biologist and author of many identification guides to sea fishes. He has described new species of seahorses in the genus Hippocampus.

Early life 
Kuiter was born in Amersfoort, Netherlands and emigrated to Australia in 1964.

Career 
Kuiter is best known for his photo-illustrated identification guides to fishes. Some are dedicated to fishes found in certain regions and others are more specialised publications which catalog various sub-groups of fishes.

Publications 
 Photo Guide to Fishes of the Maldives by Rudie H. Kuiter
 Guide to Sea Fishes of Australia by Rudie H. Kuiter
 A Photographic Guide to Sea Fishes of Australia by Rudie H. Kuiter
 Fairy and Rainbow Wrasses: A Comprehensive Guide to Selected Labroids by Rudie H. Kuiter
 Fishes of South-Eastern Australia by Rudie H. Kuiter
 Seahorses, Pipefishes and Their Relatives by Rudie H. Kuiter
 Kaiserfische by Rudie H. Kuiter
 Coastal Fishes of South-Eastern Australia by Rudie H. Kuiter
 Surgeonfishes, Rabbitfishes and Their Relatives: A Comprehensive Guide to Acanthuroidei by Rudie H. Kuiter and Helmut Debelius
 Butterflyfishes, Bannerfishes and Their Relatives: A Comprehensive Guide to Chaetodontidae and Microcanthidae by Rudie H. Kuiter
 Indonesian Reef Fishes by Kuiter, R.H. & T. Tonozuka. 2001.

Honoria
The clingfish Kopua kuiteri was named in his honor.

See also
:Category:Taxa named by Rudie Hermann Kuiter

References
 Australian Museum: Rudie Hermann Kuiter - photographer
  Korallenriff.de: Rudie H. Kuiter

Australian marine biologists
Australian photographers
Australian underwater divers
Underwater photographers
1943 births
Living people
Australian ichthyologists
Australian taxonomists
Dutch emigrants to Australia
People from Amersfoort
20th-century Australian zoologists
21st-century Australian zoologists
20th-century photographers
21st-century photographers